Andreas Mayer (born 13 September 1972) is a German former professional footballer who played as a midfielder. He played for clubs in Germany, Norway and Scotland.

Career
Mayer was a youth player with Bayern Munich, but never appeared for the first team.

In January 1999 he moved to Scottish Premier League with Aberdeen from Norwegian club Rosenborg. The transfer fee paid to Rosenborg was reported as £200,000. In December 2000, with Mayer's contract running out in the summer, Aberdeen announced that he was free to leave the club.

References

External links 
 
 

1972 births
Living people
People from Günzburg (district)
Sportspeople from Swabia (Bavaria)
German footballers
Association football midfielders
FC Augsburg players
FC Bayern Munich II players
FC St. Pauli players
Stabæk Fotball players
Rosenborg BK players
Aberdeen F.C. players
KSV Hessen Kassel players
SV Wilhelmshaven players
VfB Oldenburg players
2. Bundesliga players
Scottish Premier League players
Eliteserien players
Footballers from Bavaria
German expatriate footballers
German expatriate sportspeople in Norway
Expatriate footballers in Norway
German expatriate sportspeople in Scotland
Expatriate footballers in Scotland